Maciej Bębenek (born 22 September 1984 in Kraków) is a Polish former professional footballer who played as a midfielder.

Career
In September 2017, Bębenek joined Wiślanie Jaśkowice. He played for the club until January 2019, where he re-joined his childhood club Wieczysta Kraków.

References

External links
 

1984 births
Living people
Footballers from Kraków
Association football midfielders
Polish footballers
Kmita Zabierzów players
Widzew Łódź players
Polonia Bytom players
Sandecja Nowy Sącz players
Górnik Zabrze players
GKS Katowice players
Ekstraklasa players
I liga players
III liga players